The 1973 European Super Cup was played between 1972–73 European Cup winners Ajax and 1972–73 European Cup Winners' Cup winners Milan, with Ajax winning 6–1 on aggregate, making it the worst defeat for an Italian team in an UEFA competition final. Unlike future Super Cup matches, the 1973 edition took place at the start of the following calendar year rather than the start of the following season.

First leg

Second leg

See also
1973 European Cup Final
1973 European Cup Winners' Cup Final
A.C. Milan in European football
AFC Ajax in European football

References

Super Cup
1973
Super Cup 1973
Super Cup 1973
Super Cup 1973
Super Cup 1973
Super Cup
Super Cup
January 1974 sports events in Europe
Sports competitions in Milan
1970s in Milan
European Super Cup, 1973
1970s in Amsterdam